Lozells and East Handsworth was a ward in Birmingham, England, created at the June 2004 elections. It was represented by 3 councillors on Birmingham City Council. It was superseded in 2018 by the single-member wards of Handsworth, Lozells and Birchfield.

Population
The 2001 Population Census recorded that there were 28,806 people living in the ward. The ward has an ethnic minority population of 82.6%, the largest portion of which is Muslim of Pakistani descent, mainly from Mirpur.

White British – 4,110
South Asian – 15,706
Black British – 5,524
Mixed Race – 1,048
Chinese or Other – 842

Election results

2000s

1990s

1980s

1970s

1960s

1950s

1940s

References

External links
Birmingham City Council: Lozells and East Handsworth Ward

Former wards of Birmingham, West Midlands